Aurel Manga (born 24 July 1992) is a French athlete specialising in hurdling. He finished sixth at the 2016 European Championships and fifth at the 2017 European Indoor Championships.

Career

His personal bests are 13.33 seconds in the 110 metres hurdles (+1.7 m/s, Angers 2016) and 7.53 seconds in the 60 metres hurdles (Bordeaux 2017).

On March 4, 2018, Manga won the bronze medal at the World Indoor Championships 2018 Birmingham in the 60 m hurdles, where Britain's Andrew Pozzi (7.46 seconds) beat America's Jarret Eaton (7.47 seconds) in a photo finish. He repeated his bronze medal win at the  2019 European Athletics Indoor Championships in Glasgow, UK.

Personal life
Born in France, Manga is of Gabonese descent.

International competitions

References

1992 births
Living people
Athletes from Paris
French male hurdlers
World Athletics Championships athletes for France
Athletes (track and field) at the 2020 Summer Olympics
Olympic athletes of France
French sportspeople of Gabonese descent
20th-century French people
21st-century French people
Black French sportspeople